This is a list of films produced by the Tollywood (Telugu language film industry) based in Hyderabad in the year 1979.

Top grossing films 
 Vetagaadu - 
 Driver Ramudu - 
 Karthika Deepam - 
 Gorintaku - 
 Mande Gundelu -

The list

References

1979
Telugu
Telugu films